Julián Illanes Minucci (born 10 March 1997) is an Argentine professional footballer who plays as a centre-back for Italian  club Novara on loan from Avellino.

Career
Illanes began his career with Instituto. He made his senior debut in a Copa Argentina tie with Arsenal de Sarandí on 23 July 2014, prior to featuring in Primera B Nacional for the first time on the final day of the 2014 season during a victory away to Guaraní Antonio Franco on 6 December. Illanes scored his first professional goal in February 2016 against Estudiantes. On 18 January 2017, Serie A side Fiorentina signed Illanes. In July 2018, Illanes was loaned to Argentinos Juniors of the Argentine Primera División. His loan was terminated in January after not featuring. Illanes joined Avellino on loan on 20 August 2019.

On 23 September 2020, after scoring once (versus Bari) in twenty-six games for Avellino, Illanes joined Serie B club Chievo on a season-long loan. He made his debut in a Coppa Italia second round defeat to Catanzaro on 30 September. His loan was cancelled on 11 January 2021, after he had failed to make a league appearance for the club; appearing on the bench ten times. Illanes was immediately loaned back out by Fiorentina, as the centre-back agreed a return to Avellino of Serie C.

On 19 July 2021, he joined Pescara on a permanent basis.

On 18 August 2022, Illanes returned to Avellino once again. On 19 January 2023, he was loaned to Novara until the end of the season.

Career statistics
.

References

External links

1997 births
Living people
Footballers from Córdoba, Argentina
Argentine footballers
Association football defenders
Argentine expatriate footballers
Expatriate footballers in Italy
Argentine expatriate sportspeople in Italy
Primera Nacional players
Serie C players
Instituto footballers
ACF Fiorentina players
Argentinos Juniors footballers
U.S. Avellino 1912 players
A.C. ChievoVerona players
Delfino Pescara 1936 players
Novara F.C. players